Warren Swan (born 30 May 1983) is a South African cricketer. He played in 28 first-class and 34 List A matches from 2004 to 2009.

References

External links
 

1983 births
Living people
South African cricketers
Boland cricketers
Cape Cobras cricketers
Gauteng cricketers
Lions cricketers
Cricketers from Johannesburg